James Kimberley Corden  (born 22 August 1978) is an English actor, comedian, singer, writer, producer, and television host. In the United Kingdom, he is best known for co-writing and starring in the critically acclaimed BBC sitcom Gavin & Stacey. In the United States, he is best known as the host of The Late Late Show with James Corden, a late-night talk show that has been on CBS since 2015 and is set to end mid-2023.

Originally airing from 2007 to 2010, Corden co-wrote and co-starred with Welsh actress Ruth Jones in Gavin & Stacey, for which he won the BAFTA Television Award for Best Comedy Performance. He was featured, along with grime artist Dizzee Rascal, on the UK No.1 single "Shout", an unofficial anthem of the England football team for the 2010 FIFA World Cup in South Africa. Appearing on the UK charity telethon Comic Relief in 2011, Corden created his Carpool Karaoke sketch when he drove around London singing songs with George Michael. In 2009, he co-presented the Brit Awards with Kylie Minogue and Mathew Horne. Corden returned to host the ceremony solo between 2011 and 2014. He hosted the Tony Awards in 2016 and 2019 and the Grammy Awards in 2017 and 2018. Since 2010, Corden has presented the sports-based comedy panel show A League of Their Own on Sky One. He has appeared in films, including Gulliver's Travels (2010), Into the Woods (2014), Kill Your Friends (2015), Peter Rabbit (2018) and its 2021 sequel (in which he voiced the title character). He's also known for his roles in the musical films Cats (2019), The Prom (2020), and Cinderella (2021).

In 2011, Corden played the lead part in the comedy play One Man, Two Guvnors, which transferred from the National Theatre to the West End and then to Broadway and was also cinecast worldwide via National Theatre Live. For his performance in the Broadway run of the play, Corden won the Tony Award for Best Actor in a Play. In 2015, he received the BAFTA Britannia Award for British Artist of the Year. As a presenter and talk show host, Corden has been nominated for 22 Primetime Emmy Awards, winning 9 in total, including for The Late Late Show, Carpool Karaoke and hosting the 70th Tony Awards. Corden was appointed an Officer of the Order of the British Empire (OBE) in the 2015 New Year Honours for services to drama.

In 2018, the Seatbelt Psychic television series was produced by Corden and his production company Fulwell 73 for Lifetime platform.

Early life
Corden was born in Hillingdon, Greater London, the son of Margaret and Malcolm Corden. His father was a musician in the Central Band of the Royal Air Force (and later became a salesman of Christian books and Bibles). Corden's mother was a social worker. He grew up in Hazlemere, Buckinghamshire, and attended Park Middle School and Holmer Green Upper School. He has two sisters.

Career

Early career
Corden's first stage appearance was at the age of 18, with a one-line part in the 1996 musical Martin Guerre. His first TV reporter role was on the BBC's Good Morning with Anne and Nick, interviewing Meat Loaf. His early television work included Gareth Jones in the 1999 series Boyz Unlimited. He also starred in Tango advertisements in 1998 and had a role as a bookish student in Teachers and in 2000 a small part in an episode of Hollyoaks. Corden had guest appearances on Little Britain and Dalziel and Pascoe, both in 2004. Corden's early film credits include Whatever Happened to Harold Smith? (1999), Mike Leigh's All or Nothing (2002), Heartlands (2002), and Cruise of the Gods (2002).

Rise to prominence
From 2000 to 2005, Corden starred in the British television series Fat Friends as Jamie Rymer. He garnered a nomination for the 2000 Royal Television Society Award for Network Newcomer On Screen for his work. Beginning in 2004 Corden played the role of Timms in the original London stage production of Alan Bennett's play The History Boys, as well as in the Broadway, Sydney, Wellington, and Hong Kong productions. He also was in the radio and 2006 film adaptation versions of the play. In 2006, he appeared in the film Starter for 10.

From 2007 to 2010, Corden co-starred in his own series, the BBC Three sitcom Gavin & Stacey. He co-wrote the series with his Fat Friends co-star Ruth Jones; Corden and Jones played the friends of the title characters, with Corden starring as Smithy. The series proved popular and was well-received critically. For the show, Corden won Best Male Comedy Performer and Gavin & Stacey won Best New British Television Comedy at the 2007 British Comedy Awards. At the 2008 Television BAFTAs, Corden won the BAFTA for Best Male Comedy Performance, and Gavin & Stacey won the BAFTA's Audience Award for Programme of the Year. In December 2008, the show won Best TV Comedy in the 2008 British Comedy Awards. Gavin & Stacey also won the award for Most Popular Comedy Programme at the National Television Awards in 2010. In 2019, Gavin & Stacey returned for a Christmas special, with the episode achieving the highest Christmas Day viewership in the UK for more than a decade.

Work outside Gavin & Stacey
During the two year and seven months run of Gavin & Stacey, Corden's professional endeavours outside the successful series proved somewhat chequered. He guest hosted Big Brother's Big Mouth, with Gavin & Stacey co-star Mathew Horne, in August 2007. In 2008, he appeared in the film of Toby Young's 2001 autobiography How to Lose Friends & Alienate People. He collaborated again with Horne on a 2009 sketch show named Horne & Corden, described by the BBC as a "traditional comedy entertainment show in the style of Morecambe and Wise". The show ran for only one series and was poorly received by the critics, with Corden later admitting "the absolute truth is I wasn't good enough."

In 2009, Corden starred as the lead character in the film Lesbian Vampire Killers, which was not successful. That year he played Clem Cattini in the Joe Meek biopic Telstar, and likewise in the animated Planet 51 along with Mathew Horne. In February 2009, he co-presented the Brit Awards with Horne and Kylie Minogue. On 13 March 2009, he appeared in a sketch for the UK charity telethon Comic Relief giving the England football team a motivational talk, and later presented a section with Horne showing their best bits of comedy from the previous two years along with highlights from the night.

In March 2010, Corden began hosting the Sky 1 comedy/sports panel show A League of Their Own alongside team captains Andrew Flintoff and Jamie Redknapp. In March 2010, he presented Sport Relief 2010 alongside Davina McCall and others, contributing a "sequel" to the 2009 England football team sketch, this time giving a motivational talk to various sports stars including David Beckham and motor racing driver Jenson Button.

In March 2010, Corden took part in Channel 4's Comedy Gala, a benefit show held in aid of Great Ormond Street Children's Hospital, filmed live at the O2 Arena in London. On 5 June 2010, he performed his England World Cup single with Dizzee Rascal on the finale of Britain's Got Talent. The proceeds from the single went to London's Great Ormond Street Hospital.

In June 2010, Corden played Craig Owens in the Doctor Who episode "The Lodger", in which the Doctor moved in with him. Corden returned as Owens in "Closing Time" in the sixth series. In December 2010, This Is JLS, an hour-long Christmas special featuring the boyband and The X Factor runners-up, was aired on ITV1, with Corden writing and producing some of the sketches featured in the special. In 2010, he was in the main cast of the film Gulliver's Travels. In December 2010, he was part of an ensemble voice cast in the English dub of the German animated film Animals United alongside Jim Broadbent, Jason Donovan, Joanna Lumley, Billie Piper, Andy Serkis and others.

In February 2011, Corden presented the 2011 Brit Awards. In March, Corden reprised his Gavin & Stacey role as Smithy in a Red Nose Day sketch for the charity telethon Comic Relief. The sketch included appearances by then UK Prime Minister Gordon Brown, JLS, Paul McCartney, and Justin Bieber. The show also saw the first appearance of his Carpool Karaoke sketch, which saw him singing songs with pop star George Michael while driving around London. In 2011, he appeared in The Three Musketeers.

Starting in June 2011, Corden played the lead role in the hit comedy play One Man, Two Guvnors. The play was cinecast worldwide as part of the National Theatre Live cinecasts, and transferred from the National Theatre to the West End after touring. The show received universal critical acclaim and won Best Play at the Evening Standard Theatre Awards for 2011. The Guardian deemed it "A triumph of visual and verbal comedy. One of the funniest productions in the National's history." The Daily Telegraph described it as "the feelgood hit of the Summer"; while The Independent called it a "massive hit", and the Evening Standard "a surefire hit".

Corden made a cameo appearance in the music video for the single "Mama Do the Hump" by Rizzle Kicks, released in December 2011, which reached #2 in the charts. In April 2012, One Man, Two Guvnors transferred to Broadway, with Corden continuing to play the lead. In June 2012, he won the Tony Award for Best Performance by a Leading Actor in a Play for his performance.

In February 2012, Corden hosted the Brit Awards for the third time. Corden starred as the Baker in the Disney film adaptation of the musical Into the Woods (film) (2014). In 2015, Corden narrated Roald Dahl's Esio Trot, a BBC television film adaptation of Roald Dahl's classic novel. Adapted by Richard Curtis and co-starring Dustin Hoffman and Judi Dench, it was broadcast on BBC One on 1 January 2015. In 2016 he appeared in the animated comedy film Trolls as Biggie, a chubby friendly Troll.

For his next project, Corden teamed up with friend and fellow Gavin & Stacey star Mathew Baynton to create, write and star in The Wrong Mans, a six-part comedy-thriller for BBC Two. The premiere was on 24 September 2013. The series was co-produced by online television provider Hulu.com in the United States and it began airing in November 2013.

The Late Late Show (2015–2023) 

On 23 March 2015, Corden succeeded Craig Ferguson as host of the American late-night talk show The Late Late Show. Corden's Carpool Karaoke through the streets of London with pop singer Adele, a sketch which featured on his talk show in January 2016, was the biggest YouTube viral video of 2016. Corden's special Carpool Karaoke: When Corden Met McCartney, Live From Liverpool was a viral and critical success earning a Primetime Emmy Award nomination and win for Outstanding Variety Special. In the special, Corden and McCartney sang the Beatles songs "Drive My Car", "Penny Lane", and "Let It Be". The pair stopped by a Penny Lane street sign, which McCartney signed,  McCartney pointed out various Liverpool landmarks including Saint Barnabas Church, where he had been a choir boy, and also visited his childhood home. The special ended with McCartney and his band surprising a small group of locals at Liverpool's Philharmonic Pub with a 13-song set that included "A Hard Day's Night", "Back in the U.S.S.R" and his new single, "Come On to Me". In April 2022, Corden announced that he would be leaving The Late Late Show in 2023.

Musical films 
In 2019, Corden starred in Tom Hooper's feature film adaptation of Andrew Lloyd Webber's popular musical Cats as Bustopher Jones, which received widespread negative attention. The film starred Jennifer Hudson, Idris Elba, Taylor Swift, Ian McKellen, and Judi Dench. Some critics called it one of the worst films of the year due to its poorly conceived CGI and off kilter comedic performances from Rebel Wilson and Corden. For his performance, Corden received the Razzie Award for Worst Supporting Actor of the year. Lloyd Webber was a vocal critic of the film, specially criticizing Corden's performance adding he "begged for it to be cut".

Corden's leading role in the 2020 musical comedy film The Prom received negative reviews, and was named "one of the worst performances of the 21st century" by Vanity Fair'''s Richard Lawson. Lawson elaborated writing, "Corden, flitting and lisping around in the most uninspired of caricatures, misses all potential for nuance, and thus never finds even a hint of truth in the role". His portrayal of a gay man while he himself is straight was deemed offensive by many film critics and members of the LBGTQ community with critics adding that the performance perpetuated and capitalized on stereotypes of gay white men. Corden received an even larger amount of backlash when this performance earned him a Golden Globe Award nomination for Best Actor in a Musical or Comedy Film.

Corden also received negative reviews for his performance in the 2021 adaptation of Cinderella, a film which he produced. Clarisse Loughrey of The Independent wrote, "James Corden has made a #Girlboss fairytale only a voracious capitalist could love".

 Awards host 
Corden hosted the Tony Awards in 2016 and 2019, and the Grammy Awards in 2017 and 2018.

Influences
Corden has said that his comedy influences are Graham Norton, Chris Evans, Jonathan Ross, Conan O'Brien, David Letterman, and Stephen Colbert.

 Personal life 
Corden shared a flat with The History Boys co-star Dominic Cooper for several years. Cooper introduced Corden to his future wife Julia Carey, whom Cooper had known for years. Corden married Carey on 15 September 2012. The Cordens have three children. Corden is a supporter of Premier League football club West Ham United.

Corden traced his life’s ups and downs very frankly on the BBC radio show Desert Island Discs in September 2012 in which he discussed his controversial acceptance speech after receiving a Tony Award that year.

Corden was appointed Officer of the Order of the British Empire in the 2015 New Year Honours for services to drama.2015 New Year Honours List  He received the honour from Princess Anne during a ceremony at Buckingham Palace on 25 June 2015.

Corden resides in Los Angeles with his family. He maintains a home in Belsize Park, London, and Templecombe House at Wargrave in Berkshire.

In April 2020 during the COVID-19 pandemic, Corden paid the salaries of furloughed employees on the Late Late Show''. He also launched a fundraising campaign with the NBA to benefit Feed the Children. On January 6, 2022, Corden announced that he had tested positive for COVID-19. He mentioned that he was fine and that he was already fully vaccinated and boosted.

In 2022, Corden was banned from New York restaurant Balthazar by proprietor Keith McNally, after reportedly being "abusive" and "extremely nasty" to staff. The ban was later rescinded after Corden apologised to McNally in private and in public, admitting that he had been "ungracious."

Filmography

Film

Television

Theatre

Video games

Music videos

Advertising

Discography

Singles

Other appearances

Published works

References

External links

1978 births
20th-century English comedians
21st-century English comedians
20th-century English male actors
21st-century English male actors
21st-century English writers
Best Comedy Performance BAFTA Award (television) winners
British male television writers
Comedians from London
Drama Desk Award winners
English autobiographers
English expatriates in the United States
English male comedians
English male film actors
English male singers
English male stage actors
English male television actors
English male voice actors
English male non-fiction writers
English television producers
English television writers
Living people
Male actors from London
People from High Wycombe
People from Hillingdon
People from Wargrave
Primetime Emmy Award winners
Officers of the Order of the British Empire
The Late Late Show with James Corden
Tony Award winners
Writers from London